The 25th Alberta Legislative Assembly was in session from April 9, 2001, to October 25, 2004, with the membership of the assembly determined by the results of the 2001 Alberta general election held on March 12, 2001. The Legislature officially resumed on April 9, 2001, and continued until the fourth session was prorogued and dissolved on October 25, 2004, prior to the 2004 Alberta general election on November 22, 2004.

Alberta's twenty-fifth government was controlled by the majority Progressive Conservative Association of Alberta, led by Premier Ralph Klein. The Official Opposition was led by Ken Nicol of the Liberal Party.  The Speaker was Ken Kowalski. With the exception of the three MLAs listed below, all members held their seats until dissolution of the legislature.

History
The 25th Legislative Assembly was ushered in with a massive Progressive Conservative majority, with Alberta being dubbed Ralph's World following the 2001 general election. The official opposition Liberals began a turbulent period that would see the party go through four leaders.

The third party Alberta New Democrats also changed leaders in July 2004 with the retirement of Raj Pannu and choice of Brian Mason as new leader.

Towards the end of the legislature for the first time since 1985, a new party caucus was formed. Edmonton-Norwood MLA Gary Masyk would cross the floor to the Alberta Alliance which had been formed in 2002 and registered in 2003 creating the caucus for that party. His reason for leaving was the Premier's interference in the 2004 federal election that coincided with a sharp decline in poll numbers that kept the federal Conservatives from winning the election. His electoral district was also abolished in the 2004 Alberta Boundary Re-distribution.

Support the Progressive Conservatives softened through the reign of the Assembly but still remained high during the 2004 general election.

Bills

Adult Interdependent Relationships Act

The Adult Interdependent Relationships Act (S.A. 2002, c. A-4.5) was passed by the Alberta Legislature on December 4, 2002, and proclaimed in force on June 1, 2003. The act did not amend Alberta's Marriage Act, but did amend 69 other Alberta laws following the 1999 landmark Supreme Court of Canada ruling in the case of M. v. H., which essentially required all provinces to extend the benefits of common-law marriage to same-sex couples, under the equality provisions of Section Fifteen of the Canadian Charter of Rights and Freedoms.  Owing to the conservative political climate in the province, the government of Alberta was slow to respond, but in 2000 Alberta did amend the provincial Marriage Act to specifically limit marriage to different-sex couples. The Act was based on the January 2002 Alberta Law Reform Institute recommendations in  Recognition of Rights and Obligations in Same-Sex Relationships which was funded in part by the provincial government.

Electoral Divisions Act

The Electoral Divisions Act (S.A. 2003, c. E-4.1) was passed by the Alberta Legislature during the third session, and received Royal Assent on May 15, 2003. The Act implemented the recommendations of the Final Report of the Electoral Boundaries Commission, chaired by former Social Credit MLA and Alberta's Ethics Commissioner Robert Curtis Clark which delineated the new electoral boundaries for the upcoming 2004 Alberta general election and the 26th Alberta Legislature. The new electoral boundaries retained a total of 83 seats, with Calgary gaining two seats, Edmonton losing one seat, and one of the "special consideration" divisions (due to its isolation, it is allowed to have a population below 75% of the provincial average) was eliminated, leaving Dunvegan-Central Peace the last remaining special consideration district.

Members of the 25th Legislature by district

Standings changes during the 25th Assembly

December 31, 2001 Robert Fischer, Wainwright resigns
April 8, 2002 Doug Griffiths, Wainwright elected in a by-election
May 25, 2004 Ken Nicol, Lethbridge-East resigns to run in a federal election
May 28, 2004 Debby Carlson, Edmonton Ellerslie resigned to run in a federal election
June 29, 2004 Gary Masyk, Edmonton Norwood crossed the floor to the Alberta Alliance

References

Further reading

External links
Alberta Legislative Assembly
Legislative Assembly of Alberta Members Book
By-elections 1905 to present

25